Jandre Burger (born 21 May 2001) is a South African rugby union player for the  in the Currie Cup and . His regular position is fly-half.

Burger was named in the  squad for the 2021 Currie Cup Premier Division.

References

South African rugby union players
2001 births
Living people
Rugby union fly-halves
Blue Bulls players
Bulls (rugby union) players
Rugby union players from the Western Cape